The Kholova is a river in Krestetsky and Malovishersky Districts of Novgorod Oblast in Russia. It is a left tributary of the Msta. The principal tributaries of the Kholova are the Khuba (right) and the Moshnya (left). The urban-type settlement of Kresttsy is located on the Kholova.

The source of the Kholova lies in Valday Hills, in the system of interconnected lakes at the border between Okulovsky and Krestetsky District. The river flows west, turns northwest, passes Kresttsy, turns north and enters Malovishersky District. Downstream of Kresttsy, it runs along the Ilmen Depression, which is almost flat. The mouth of the Kholova is close to the village of Zakholovye.

The Kholova is the main river of Krestetsky District. Its river basin comprises most of the area of the district, as well as minor areas in the southwest of Okulovsky District and in the southwest of Malovishersky District.

References

External links
 

Rivers of Novgorod Oblast